Jablonné nad Orlicí is a town in Ústí nad Orlicí District in the Pardubice Region of the Czech Republic. It has about 2,900 inhabitants. The town centre is well preserved and is protected by law as an urban monument zone.

Etymology
The town was originally called Gablona, which was probably a term for a customhouse, where charges were levied for transported salt.

History

The first written mention of Jablonné is from 1304 as Gablona. It was founded in the second half of the 13th century, probably in 1285, when the Lanšperk estate was donated to Zavis of Falkenstein by King Wenceslaus II of Bohemia.

In the first half of the 14th century Jablonné belonged to Zbraslav Monastery. From 1409 to 1453 Jablonné formed a small separate estate. In 1453, it was acquired by the Kostka of Postupice family and merged again with Lanšperk estate. In 1507, Jablonné was bought by the Pernštejn family and in 1508, it was promoted to a market town.

In 1588, Jablonné was acquired by the Hřán family, and sold to Karl I, Prince of Liechtenstein in 1622. His descendants held possession of Jablonné until 1918. In 1874, the railway was built, which started the economical development of the market town. In 1906, Jablonné was promoted to a town.

Transport
Jablonné nad Orlicí lies on the railway from Ústí nad Orlicí to Štíty.

Main road I/11 Hradec Králové – Mosty u Jablunkova leads through the town.

Sights

The historic centre is formed by the 5. května Square and adjacent streets. In the historic centre there are many preserved houses in folk architecture and in the Baroque style. The landmark of the square is a storey farmhouse with arcade and wooden porch from 1750, nowadays the town hall. The Marian column in the middle of the square is from 1748.

The Church of Saint Bartholomew was built in Baroque style in 1732. It replaced an older church destroyed by fire.

Notable people
Andrea Kalousová (born 1996), Czech Miss 2015

Twin towns – sister cities
Jablonné nad Orlicí is twinned with:
 Hinwil, Switzerland
 Kondratowice, Poland 
 Seehausen, Germany

Jablonné nad Orlicí also cooperates with Stockerau in Austria.

References

External links

Populated places in Ústí nad Orlicí District
Cities and towns in the Czech Republic